John Strode Barbour Jr. (December 29, 1820May 14, 1892) was a slave owner, U.S. Representative and a Senator from Virginia, and fought against the United States in the Confederate Army. He took power in Virginia from the short-lived Readjuster Party in the late 1880s, forming the first political machine of "Conservative Democrats", whose power was to last 80 years until the demise of the Byrd Organization in the late 1960s.

Early life
Barbour was born on December 29, 1820, at Catalpa, near Culpeper, Virginia, the son of Virginia delegate and future U.S. Representative John S. Barbour. He had two sisters and a younger brother. Barbour attended the common schools and graduated from the law department of the University of Virginia at Charlottesville. He married Susan Dangerfield, daughter of a prominent family in Prince George's County, Maryland. His wife died in 1886.

Career 
Following his father's career path, Barbour was admitted to the Virginia bar in 1841 and began his legal practice in Culpeper. Five years later he ran for and won election as a member of the Virginia House of Delegates, serving (part-time, along with his private legal practice) from 1847 to 1851. Barbour became president of the Orange and Alexandria Railroad Co., serving from 1852 to 1881.

During the American Civil War, Barbour was a Confederate officer, as was his younger brother James. The family's Fleetwood Hill hosted General J.E.B. Stuart after the Confederate victory at the Battle of Chancellorsville, but the June 1863 engagement with Union forces, the Battle of Brandy Station (perhaps the largest cavalry battle of the war) was considered a draw.

After the war, both John and James resumed their legal careers, but while John concentrated in railroad matters, James bought the Richmond Enquirer and became its editor. After the restoration of civil rights to Confederate officers, John Barbour was elected as a Democrat to the 47th and two succeeding Congresses (March 4, 1881 - March 3, 1887). He succeeded Eppa Hunton II, a fellow Shenandoah valley lawyer who declined to seek renomination. Barbour served as chairman of the Committee on the District of Columbia (48th and 49th Congresses). He declined to be a candidate for renomination in 1886, months  after the death of his wife (and the year after his brother James was elected to Virginia's House of Delegates).

In the late 1880s, Barbour joined with other Conservative Democrats and opposed the Readjuster Party, a coalition of blacks and Republicans led by Harrison H. Riddleberger and William Mahone. He helped form the first political machine of "Conservative Democrats", whose power lasted 80 years until the demise of the Byrd Organization  in the late 1960s.

In 1888, Barbour ran to succeed Senator Riddleberger when he declined to seek re-election (and died the following year). Elected as a Democrat to the United States Senate Barbour served from March 4, 1889, until his death. Hunton was appointed to serve until the election for the remainder of the term, which he won but declined to seek a full term.

Death and legacy
Barbour died at his home in Washington, D.C. on May 14, 1892. He was interred in the burial ground at "Poplar Hill", Prince George's County, Maryland beside his wife Susan. His brother James' son, John S. Barbour, briefly became a newspaper editor, and later lawyer and mayor of Culpeper, although he moved to Fairfax County, Virginia.

See also
List of United States Congress members who died in office (1790–1899)

Sources

 
 Memorial Services for John S. Barbour Jr. 52nd Cong., 2nd sess., 1892–1893. Washington, D.C.: Government Printing Office, 1893
 Quinn, James Thomas. "Senator John S. Barbour, Jr. and the Restoration of Virginia Democracy, 1883-1892." Master's thesis, University of Virginia, 1966.

External links

John S. Barbour Jr. at Encyclopedia Virginia

1820 births
1892 deaths
People from Culpeper County, Virginia
Barbour family
American Presbyterians
Democratic Party members of the United States House of Representatives from Virginia
Democratic Party United States senators from Virginia
Democratic Party members of the Virginia House of Delegates
19th-century American politicians
Virginia lawyers
University of Virginia School of Law alumni
American slave owners
United States senators who owned slaves